Sylvia Moss (1943-2022) was an American National Champion bridge player.

Bridge accomplishments

Wins
 North American Bridge Championships (10)
 Smith Life Master Women's Pairs (1) 1997 
 Sternberg Women's Board-a-Match Teams (2) 1998, 2012 
 Freeman Mixed Board-a-Match (1) 2000 
 Whitehead Women's Pairs (2) 2001, 2006 
 Wagar Women's Knockout Teams (2) 2006, 2013 
 Machlin Women's Swiss Teams (2) 2006, 2013

Runners-up
 North American Bridge Championships (3)
 Reisinger (1) 2021
 Machlin Women's Swiss Teams (1) 1997 
 Whitehead Women's Pairs (1) 2011

References

External links
 
 

American contract bridge players